Ruman may refer to:

Ruman (surname)
Ruman Ahmed, Bangladeshi cricketer 
Operation RUMAN

See also
Rumman (disambiguation)
Rumana (disambiguation)
Tell Ruman, a village in Syria